Northeastern Junior College (NJC) is a public community college in Sterling, Colorado. It is a member college of the Colorado Community College System.  In 2021 Colorado legislators and college administrators considered changing the college name to Northeastern College.  After community input the name was not altered.

Academics
The college offers over 80 programs of study, with classes held at the campus or online. In addition to traditional course offerings, the college offers classes in agriculture, cosmetology, nursing, and wind energy technology.

Campus
The main campus is on the northern side of Sterling, Colorado. Buildings on the campus include the Event Center, which includes the Jackson Edwards Arena, where sporting and concert events are held, and a fitness center. The campus also includes a number of dormitories, and it has a bookstore and the Monahan Library. The Hays Student Center functions as the campus' student union.

Athletics
NJC offers team sports in baseball, men's and women's basketball, golf, rodeo, softball, men's and women's soccer, Livestock Judging, volleyball and wrestling.

References

External links
Official website

Colorado Community College System
Buildings and structures in Sterling, Colorado
Education in Logan County, Colorado
NJCAA athletics
Educational institutions established in 1941
Sterling, Colorado
1941 establishments in Colorado